James H. Anderson may refer to:

James H. Anderson (computer scientist), American computer scientist
James H. Anderson (politician) (1878–1936), Lieutenant Governor of Delaware in the 1920s
James Hodson Anderson (1909–1996), Nebraska Attorney General